Cory is an unincorporated community in Perry Township, Clay County, Indiana. It is part of the Terre Haute Metropolitan Statistical Area.  Cory hosts the annual Cory Apple Festival.

History
Cory was platted in 1872. It was named for Simeon Cory, an area businessman. At one time there were 3 taverns in Cory.

Geography

Notable People from Cory 
Pamela J. Farris, Ph.D., Author and Distinguished Teaching Professor

John Rector, baseball pitcher and basketball player, was a minor league player for Baltimore Orioles

Robert Jackson, standout basketball player for Cory High School, successful businessman, and professional bowler

References

External links

Unincorporated communities in Clay County, Indiana
Unincorporated communities in Indiana
Terre Haute metropolitan area
1872 establishments in Indiana
Populated places established in 1872